Huajing is a town located in the Xuhui District of Shanghai.

References

Towns in Shanghai
Xuhui District